North Point Terminus is a tram stop and one of the seven termini of Hong Kong Tramways, a double-decker tram system. Located in North Point, it is one of the system's two termini in the Eastern District on Hong Kong Island.

History
The terminus opened on 21 December 1953, replacing the old Causeway Bay terminus. All trams that originally had Causeway Bay as their terminus switched to this terminus.

Route
North Point ↔ Shek Tong Tsui

References

Hong Kong Tramways stops